The Treaty of Amity and Commerce between France and Japan (Japanese: 日仏修好通商条約) (1858) opened diplomatic relations and trade between the two counties.

Description
The treaty was signed in Edo on October 9, 1858, by Jean-Baptiste Louis Gros, the commander of the French expedition in China, assisted by Charles de Chassiron and Alfred de Moges, opening diplomatic relations between the two countries. The Treaty was signed following the signature of the Harris Treaty between the United States and Japan, as France, Russia, Great Britain, and Holland quickly followed the American example: Japan was forced to apply to other nations the conditions granted to the United States under the "most favoured nation" provision. These 1858 treaties with the five nations are known collectively as "Ansei Treaties". The most important points of these Unequal Treaties were:

 exchange of diplomatic agents.
 Edo, Kobe, Nagasaki, Niigata, and Yokohama’s opening to foreign trade as ports.
 ability of foreign citizens to live and trade at will in those ports (only opium trade was prohibited).
 a system of extraterritoriality that provided for the subjugation of foreign residents to the laws of their own consular courts instead of the Japanese law system.
 fixed low import-export duties, subject to international control, thus depriving the Japanese government control of foreign trade and protection of national industries (the rate would go as low as 5% in the 1860s.)

In 1859, Gustave Duchesne de Bellecourt arrived and became the first French representative in Japan. A French Consulate was opened that year at the Temple of Saikai-ji, in Mita, Edo, at the same time as an American Consulate was established at the Temple of Zenpuku-ji, and a British Consulate at the Temple of Tōzen-ji.

The ratified Treaty was brought to the shōgun by Duchesne de Bellecourt, on February 4, 1860.

See also
 List of Ambassadors from France to Japan
 France-Japan relations (19th century)
 Treaty of Commerce and Navigation between Japan and Russia, 7 February 1855.
 Treaty of Amity and Commerce (United States-Japan) on July 29, 1858.
 Treaty of Amity and Commerce between the Netherlands and Japan on August 18, 1858.
 Treaty of Amity and Commerce between Russia and Japan on August 19, 1858.
 Anglo-Japanese Treaty of Amity and Commerce on August 26, 1858.
 Treaty of Peace, Amity and Commerce between Portugal and Japan on August 3, 1860
 Treaty of Amity and Commerce between Prussia and Japan on January 24, 1861.

Notes

References

 Auslin, Michael R. (2004).   Negotiating with Imperialism: The Unequal Treaties and the Culture of Japanese Diplomacy. Cambridge: Harvard University Press. ;  OCLC 56493769
 Halleck, Henry Wager. (1861).  International law: or, Rules regulating the intercourse of states in peace and war 	New York: D. Van Nostrand. OCLC 852699
 Omoto Keiko, Marcouin Francis (1990) Quand le Japon s'ouvrit au monde (in French) Gallimard, Paris, 
 Polak, Christian. (2001). Soie et lumières: L'âge d'or des échanges franco-japonais (des origines aux années 1950). Tokyo: Chambre de Commerce et d'Industrie Française du Japon, Hachette Fujin Gahōsha (アシェット婦人画報社).
 __. (2002). 絹と光: 知られざる日仏交流100年の歴史 (江戶時代-1950年代) Kinu to hikari: shirarezaru Nichi-Futsu kōryū 100-nen no rekishi (Edo jidai–1950-nendai). Tokyo: Ashetto Fujin Gahōsha, 2002. ; 

Unequal treaties
France–Japan relations
1858 in France
1858 in Japan
1858 treaties
Amity and Commerce (France-Japan)
Amity and Commerce (France-Japan)
October 1858 events
Bilateral treaties of Japan
Bilateral treaties of France